Naas South is a barony in County Kildare, Republic of Ireland.

Etymology
Naas South derives its name from the town of Naas (Irish Nás na Ríogh, "assembly-place of the kings").

Location

Naas South barony is located in east County Kildare, containing part of the upper Liffey valley and the western foothills of the Wicklow Mountains.

History
These were part of the ancient lands of the Ó Broin (O'Byrnes) before the 13th century, retaken in the 14th. There was originally a single Naas barony, divided into north and south baronies before 1603.

List of settlements

Below is a list of settlements in Naas South:
Ballymore Eustace

References

Baronies of County Kildare